Shorties Watchin' Shorties is an American adult animated comedy television series that aired on Comedy Central from April 28 to December 16, 2004. The show is made up of various short animated clips with audio from comedians' stand up routines. It also features two "shorties," a pair of babies voiced by Nick DiPaolo and Patrice O'Neal who watch and comment upon the routines on TV. For many of the episodes, the babies only stayed in the house, but in later episodes, they were shown walking around the city.

The show featured comedians such as Dane Cook, Bill Burr, Brian Regan, Brian Posehn, Chris Hardwick, Mitch Hedberg, Mike Birbiglia, Jim Gaffigan and Lewis Black.

The animation was scripted and produced at World Famous Pictures and Augenblick Studios. The show was not renewed but full episodes are available on DVD. Clips from the show were posted on the Comedy Central website as well as on Hulu and Netflix. 14 episodes were produced and 13 aired.

Plot
The series is set around in Baby Nick's house. Where when Baby Nick's mom is away, his babysitter is there to watch him along with his best friend who always hangout in his house, Baby Patrice. There they get bored and started to watch animated clips about real-life living people from the routine. Whether it's Dane Cook or Lewis Black.

Characters

Main characters
 Baby Nick (voiced by Nick DiPaolo) - He is one of the two main characters in the series. He is the best friend of Baby Patrice who likes to watch and comment upon the routines on TV.
 Baby Patrice (voiced by Patrice O'Neal) - He is one of the two main characters in the series. He is the best friend of Baby Nick who also likes to watch and comment upon the routines on TV too.

Recurring characters
 Babysitter (voiced by Christine Walters) - She is the babysitter to the shorties. She always watches them at home while Baby Nick's mom is away.
 Baby Nick's Mom (voiced by Christine Walters) - She is the mother of Baby Nick. She always leaves for work while calling the babysitter to watch her son and her son's best friend while she's away.

Guest stars
 Nick DiPaolo as himself
 Dane Cook as himself
 Mike Birbiglia as himself
 Bill Burr as himself
 Adam Ferrara as himself
 Richard Jeni as himself
 Jay Mohr as himself
 Ted Alexandro as himself
 Todd Barry as himself
 Greg Behrendt as himself
 Ed Byrne as himself
 Jeremy Hotz as himself
 Patton Oswalt as himself
 Denis Leary as himself
 Lewis Black as himself
 Mitch Hedberg as himself
 Gilbert Gottfried as himself
 Bobcat Goldthwait as himself
 Kathleen Madigan as herself
 Pablo Francisco as himself
 Jeff Ross as himself
 Eddie Gossling as himself
 Pete Correale as himself
 Richard Belzer as himself
 Brian Regan as himself
 Richard Jeni as himself

Episodes

See also
 The Boss Baby: Back in Business
 Mr. Baby
 Rugrats

Further reading
 "Familiar comedians animate 'Shorties'" by Nick A. Zaino, Boston Globe (April 28, 2004)
 "Looking at Comedy Central’s Weird and Hard-to-Categorize One-Season Shows" by Liam Mathews, New York Magazine'''s Vulture (Sept 8, 2014) -- three paragraphs on Shorties Watchin' Shorties "Shorties Watchin' Shorties review" by Emily Ashby, Common Sense Media (2004)
 "Shorties Watchin' Shorties Returns on Comedy Central Oct. 28" by Sarah Baisley, Animation World Network'' (Oct 28, 2004)

References

External links
 Shorties Watchin' Shorties on the Comedy Central official website
 

2000s American adult animated television series
2004 American television series debuts
2004 American television series endings
American adult animated comedy television series
American flash adult animated television series
English-language television shows
Comedy Central original programming
Comedy Central animated television series
Animated television series about children